William Cartwright may refer to:

William Cartwright (dramatist) (1611–1643), English dramatist and churchman
William Cartwright (1634–1676), English politician who sat in the House of Commons in 1659
William Cartwright (actor) (died 1686), English actor
William Cartwright (c.1704–1768), English Member of Parliament for Northamptonshire
William Cartwright (British Army officer, died 1827) (c. 1754–1827), British general
William Cartwright (British Army officer, died 1873), British general
William Cartwright (film editor) (1920–2013), American television and film director, producer and editor 
William Cartwright (Bahamian politician) (c. 1923–2012), Bahamian politician and co-founder of the Progressive Liberal Party
William Cornwallis Cartwright (1825–1915), British Member of Parliament for Oxfordshire, 1868–1885
William Ralph Cartwright (1771–1847), English landowner and Tory politician who sat in the House of Commons between 1797 and 1846

See also
Bill Cartwright (disambiguation)